Branting is a surname. Notable people with the surname include:

Anna Branting (1855–1950), Swedish journalist and writer
Georg Branting (1887–1965), Swedish politician and fencer
Hjalmar Branting (1860–1925), Swedish politician and Prime Minister of Sweden
Kurt Branting (1900–1958), Swedish sprinter
Sonja Branting (1890–1981), Swedish lawyer and politician